Noah Young, Jr. (February 2, 1887 – April 18, 1958) was a champion weightlifter and actor.

Biography
Young was  born in Cañon City, Colorado. His father, Noah Young, was a foreman of the Glenrock coal mine who later became a coal mine inspector for the State of Wyoming; and his mother was Mary Anson, of English descent. Noah Young Sr. came from a family of coal miners in Lancashire, England; and he dabbled in bare knuckle fighting before heading to America in 1874 and settling in Colorado. He was allegedly once an Indian scout and became friends with William F. Cody.

Noah Young Jr. joined the Hal Roach studios as an actor, mainly playing comic villains. He appeared in several Laurel and Hardy comedies but was more notable as a foil for Harold Lloyd, whom he supported in over 50 films.  Young died in Los Angeles, California.

Selected filmography

 The Non-Stop Kid (1918, Short)
 Kicking the Germ Out of Germany (1918, Short)
 Two Scrambled (1918, Short)
 Bees in His Bonnet (1918, Short)
 No Place Like Jail (1918, Short)
 Nothing But Trouble (1918, Short)
 Just Rambling Along (1918, Short) - Policeman
 Hear 'Em Rave (1918, Short)
 She Loves Me Not (1918, Short)
 Do You Love Your Wife? (1919, Short) - Cop
 Wanted - $5,000 (1919, Short)
 Hustling for Health (1919, Short) - Train Conductor / The Health Inspector (uncredited)
 Ask Father (1919, Short) - Large Office Worker (uncredited)
 On the Fire (1919, Short)
 Hoots Mon! (1919, Short)
 Look Out Below (1919, Short)
 A Sammy In Siberia (1919, Short) - Burly Soldier (uncredited)
 Just Dropped In (1919, Short)
 Young Mr. Jazz (1919, Short) - Bowery Cafe Waiter (uncredited)
 Crack Your Heels (1919, Short)
 Ring Up the Curtain (1919, Short) - An Actor
 Si, Senor (1919, Short)
 Before Breakfast (1919, Short)
 The Marathon (1919, Short) - A Suitor (uncredited)
 Pistols for Breakfast (1919, Short)
 Swat the Crook (1919, Short)
 Off the Trolley (1919, Short)
 Spring Fever (1919, Short) - Office worker with large moustache
 Billy Blazes, Esq. (1919, Short) - Crooked Charley (uncredited)
 Just Neighbors (1919, Short) - (uncredited)
 At the Old Stage Door (1919, Short)
 Never Touched Me (1919, Short)
 A Jazzed Honeymoon (1919, Short)
 Chop Suey & Co. (1919, Short)
 Heap Big Chief (1919, Short)
 Don't Shove (1919, Short) - Tough guy
 Be My Wife (1919, Short)
 The Rajah (1919, Short)
 He Leads, Others Follow (1919, Short)
 Soft Money (1919, Short)
 Count the Votes (1919, Short)
 Pay Your Dues (1919, Short)
 His Only Father (1919, Short)
 Bumping Into Broadway (1919, Short) - The Bearcat's Bouncer
 Captain Kidd's Kids (1919, Short) - Big Pirate (uncredited)
 From Hand to Mouth (1919, Short) - Conspirator (uncredited)
 His Royal Slyness (1920, Short) - Count Nichola Throwe
 Haunted Spooks (1920, Short) - (uncredited)
 An Eastern Westerner (1920, Short) - Tiger Lip Tompkins, The Bully
 High and Dizzy (1920, Short) - Man who breaks hotel room door (uncredited)
 Now or Never (1921, Short) - Farm Owner (uncredited)
 Among Those Present (1921, Short) - Horse Handler (uncredited)
 I Do (1921, Short) - The Agitation
 A Sailor-Made Man (1921) - The Rowdy Element
 Grandma's Boy (1922) - Sheriff of Dabney County
 Safety Last! (1923) - The Law
 The Noon Whistle (1923, Short) - A millworker
 Kill or Cure (1923, Short) - Car owner
 Gas and Air (1923, Short)
 Zeb vs. Paprika (1924, Short)
 Brothers Under the Chin (1924, Short)
 Wide Open Spaces (1924, Short)
 The Battling Orioles (1924) - Sid Stanton
 Black Cyclone (1925) - Cowboy (uncredited)
 Should Sailors Marry? (1925, Short) - Verbena's Ex-husband
 For Heaven's Sake (1926) - Bull Brindle, The Roughneck
 Don Mike (1927) - Reuben Pettigill
 Why Girls Say No (1927, Short) - Angry Motorist (uncredited)
 Love Makes 'Em Wild (1927) - Janitor
 The Land Beyond the Law (1927) - Hanzup Harry
 The First Auto (1927) - Ned Jarvish (uncredited)
 Sugar Daddies (1927, Short) - Brittle's Brother-in-law
 Gun Gospel (1927) - Jack Goodshot
 Do Detectives Think? (1927, Short) - The Tipton Slasher (uncredited)
 Ham and Eggs at the Front (1927) - Army Sergeant
 The Battle of the Century (1927, Short) - Thunder-Clap Callahan (uncredited)
 Sharp Shooters (1928) - Tom
 A Thief in the Dark (1928) - Monk
 Welcome Danger (1929) - Officer Patrick Clancy
 Feet First (1930) - Sailor
 Everything's Rosie (1931) - Auction Shill Knocked Out (uncredited)
 Forbidden Adventure (1931)  - Bill (uncredited)
 Movie Crazy (1932) - Traffic Cop (uncredited)
 The Cat's-Paw (1934) - Strongarm (uncredited)
 The Fixer-Uppers (1935, Short) - Bartender at Café des Artistes (uncredited)
 Vagabond Lady (1935) - Man in Manhole (uncredited)
 Bonnie Scotland (1935) - Highland Quartette Member (uncredited) (final film role)

References

External links

1887 births
1958 deaths
Hal Roach Studios actors
American male silent film actors
20th-century American male actors